Villegly is a commune in the Aude department in southern France.

Geography
Villegly is a village at the edge of the Minervois area at the confluence of two streams, the Clamoux and the Seize (also spelt Ceize). It is about 14 km north-east of Carcassonne on the D620. The commune sits on the lowest foothills of the Montagne Noire at about 200 metres above sea level and has an area of 983 hectares.

History
Evidence of many periods of its history can be seen in the buildings of Villegly. The mediaeval Château de Villegly has been restored many times and demonstrates the architecture of the Renaissance and the Fin de siècle periods. The church has a thirteenth-century bell tower. The Place de la Fontaine and Place de l’Arounel, shaded by plane trees, may indicate the former location of the moat of the château. There is an eighteenth-century fountain in the Place de la Fontaine. The picturesque, narrow village streets, especially in this central part of the village, contain houses dating back to at least the 17th century, as evidenced by dated stone lintels from 1663 (2, Place de l'Eglise) and 1747 (7, Rue de la Fontaine Fraiche).

Administration

Population

Its inhabitants are called Villeglygeois.

Services
The village has a post office (open three days per week), one newsagent, one butcher, one baker and one grocery shop. There is also a campsite. The grounds of the old Château de Villegly are a pleasant public park.

Wines
The main economic activity of the commune is wine production. Vines cover most of the land outside the village itself. When the old
Château de Villegly came under the ownership of the Conseil Général of the Département de l'Aude, its vineyards and cellars were bought by Marcel Moureau. He and his sons run the business which also includes the vineyards of Chateau Villerambert-Moreau at Caunes-Minervois. The Château de Villegly label is an excellent Minervois AOC wine.

At the northeast end of the village, the young husband and wife team of Annabelle et Christophe Hernandez have set up the Domaine les Maillols vineyard which produces an excellent range of Vin de Pays and Minervois AOC wines.

Both the above wine businesses have tasting cellars in Villegly.

See also
Communes of the Aude department

References

Communes of Aude